French Creek is a stream in Clearwater County, Minnesota, in the United States. It flows into Lake Itasca.

French Creek was named for George H. French, a government surveyor.

See also
List of rivers of Minnesota

References

Rivers of Clearwater County, Minnesota
Rivers of Minnesota